The Road Up Raritan Historic District is a  historic district located along River Road in the township of  Piscataway in Middlesex County, New Jersey. It is north of Raritan Landing, once an important inland port on the Raritan River during the 18th and 19th centuries. The name is taken from an earlier colonial era name for what was once a Lenape path, Assunpink Trail that became a main road parallel to the river. Piscataway Township itself was formed on December 18, 1666 as one of the first seven townships in East Jersey, and is one of the oldest municipalities in the state. It was added to the National Register of Historic Places on September 18, 1997, for its significance in architecture, military history, and exploration/settlement. The district includes nine of fourteen historic homes along an approximately  stretch of River Road. The Metlar-Bodine House and the Cornelius Low House are also in the immediate vicinity.

Contributing properties
There are seven contributing properties in the district plus two properties that were previously listed.

See also
National Register of Historic Places listings in Middlesex County, New Jersey
East Jersey Old Town Village
Fieldville
List of the oldest buildings in New Jersey

References

External links

Historic districts on the National Register of Historic Places in New Jersey
Houses in Middlesex County, New Jersey
Piscataway, New Jersey
Pre-statehood history of New Jersey
Houses on the National Register of Historic Places in New Jersey
National Register of Historic Places in Middlesex County, New Jersey
New Jersey Register of Historic Places
1666 establishments in New Jersey